Zaghan-e Olya (also Romanized as Zāghān-e ‘Olyā; also known as Zāghān-e Bālā and Zākhān-e Bālā) is a village in Agahan Rural District, Kolyai District, Sonqor County, Kermanshah Province, Iran. At the 2006 census, its population was 267, in 64 families.

References 

Populated places in Sonqor County